The Geely Xingyue L (meaning "star cross") is a mid-size crossover SUV produced by Geely. It is marketed as the Geely Monjaro in export markets.

Overview

The Geely Xingyue L was code named the KX11 during development phase, and was designed by the Geely Design Global Center in Shanghai, China. The Geely Xingyue L rides on the CMA platform shared with the Geely Xingyue fastback compact crossover while being significantly larger and is positioned as a mid-size crossover SUV. According to Geely, the L means Larger (更大), Luxury (豪华), and Liberate (颠覆).

Powertrain
The Xingyue L is powered by the Drive-E series VEP4 2.0 liter inline-4 turbocharged injection engine from Volvo. Transmissions are a 7-speed DCT for the 2.0TD-T4 Evo engine and a 8-speed from Aisin for the 2.0TD-T5 engine.

Xingyue L Hi-X
Geely unveiled the Xingyue L Hi-X hybrid SUV in December 2021. It gets a DHE 1.5 litre three-cylinder engine with electrified tech.

References 

Xingyue L
Cars introduced in 2021
Mid-size sport utility vehicles
Crossover sport utility vehicles
Flagship vehicles
Front-wheel-drive vehicles
All-wheel-drive vehicles
Cars of China